The 2010 World's Strongest Man was the 33rd edition of World's Strongest Man held at Sun City, South Africa from Sept. 15–22. Zydrunas Savickas won his second title, Brian Shaw placed second moving up 1 spots from 3rd place the previous year, and Mikhail Koklyaev placed third.

In the finals, Zydrunas Savickas set a new world record in the Giant Wooden Log Lift for Max Weight event by lifting .

Line-up

Competitors – Original listing

Qualifying heats

Qualifying heats in World's Strongest Man involve a series of six events. The field is divided into groups of six competitors with the top two in each of the groups reaching the ten man final. A win in an event gives a competitor 6 points, second place gets 5, and so on (4,3,2,1). If there is a tie at the end of the qualifier, the competitor with the most individual event wins gets the advantage.

Heat 1

(Shaw and Petursson advance to final)

Heat 2

(Poundstone and Hollands advance to final)

† Szczepanski left the competition with a biceps injury during the Africa Stone (4th Event). He had 10 points after three events.

Heat 3

(Katona and Ortmayer advance to final)

† Sadler left the competition with a torn biceps injury in the Medley (1st event) almost as soon as it began.

Heat 4

(Savickas and Best advance to final)

† Although Best and Shahlaei tied in points, the tiebreaker is with individual event wins. Best won three events and Shahlaei only won one, so Best advanced to the final.

Heat 5

(Bergmann and Koklyaev advance to final)

§ Frampton, initially a reserve, replaced Johannes Årsjö, who withdrew prior to the competition.

Final results

Source

Television broadcast

United States
Information needed

United Kingdom
Bravo again screened both The Giants Live Tour (the official qualifying tour for The World's Strongest Man) as well as the finals. They were both aired before Bravo closed on Saturday 1 January 2011. Giants Live was shown on three consecutive days from Tuesday 21 December 2010 to Thursday 23 December 2010. The finals were broadcast on six consecutive days from Sunday 26 December 2010 to Friday 31 December 2010, with each episode dedicated to a qualifying group, and the sixth episode being the final. The UK broadcast was once again produced by IMG Media for Bravo and featured presenters Martin Bayfield and Alex Reid. The commentators were Paul Dickenson and Colin J L Bryce and the outside broadcast was performed by 021 Television Ltd.

References

External links
 Official site

2010 in sports
World's Strongest Man